The APL-2-class barracks ship was a class of barracks ships of the United States Navy after the Second World War, in the late 1940s.

Development 
Twelve ships were built during World War II with 3 cancelled. APL-12 and APL-13 were intentionally destroyed after being grounded by Typhoon Louise at Okinawa, by demolition charges, in February 1946.  Franklin D. Roosevelt approved the construction of tenders and repair ships in May 1943, it was then recommended by the Auxiliary Vessels Board on 11 June later that year, the construction of barracks ships.

The class consists of barges with a two-story barracks built on top instead of the a warehouse design, and they had an auxiliary vessel designation of "A". Moreover, on their top deck, 4 Oerlikon 20 mm cannons were placed together with 2 gun and their platforms on each side of the ship. The guns were later removed after being put into the reserve fleet in 1946.

Since 2011, only 4 ships have been in service at Naval Station San Diego.

Ships of class

See also

 Barracks ship
List of auxiliaries of the United States Navy § Barracks Craft (APL)

External links

Citations

Auxiliary ship classes
Barracks ships of the United States Navy